The individual show jumping event was part of the equestrian programme at the 1920 Summer Olympics. The competition was held on 12 September at the Olympisch Stadion in Antwerp. There were 25 competitors from 6 nations. The event was won by Tommaso Lequio di Assaba of Italy, with his teammate Alessandro Valerio earning silver. Carl Gustaf Lewenhaupt of Sweden took bronze. They were the first medals in individual jumping for both nations.

Background

This was the third appearance of the event, which had first been held at the 1900 Summer Olympics and has been held at every Summer Olympics at which equestrian sports have been featured (that is, excluding 1896, 1904, and 1908). It is the oldest event on the current programme, the only one that was held in 1900.

The United States made its debut in the event. Belgium and France both competed for the third time, the only nations to have competed at each appearance of the event to that point.

Competition format

The 800 metre course consisted of 14 obstacles, all of which were 1.3 to 1.4 meters high. The water was a maximum of 4 meters in width. The pair with the fewest faults was the winner. 

The roster of faults was changed significantly from 1912. The faults possible in 1920 were: 2 points for a first refusal, 4 for a second, 6 for a third; 8 points for a horse falling; 4 points for the rider being unseated; 2 points for knocking an obstacle down with the horse's fore legs, 1 point for knocking it down with the hind legs; 1 point for the hind legs inside the end line of a long jump, 2 points for the fore legs inside the end line; and 2 points for going off-course. Touching the end line of a distance jump was now not penalized.

Schedule

Results

References

Sources
 
 

Jumping individual